Sphyracephala subbifasciata is a species of stalk-eyed flies, insects in the family Diopsidae.

References

Diopsidae
Articles created by Qbugbot
Insects described in 1855